The men's standing long jump was a track and field athletics event held as part of the Athletics at the 1912 Summer Olympics programme. It was the fourth and final appearance of the event. The competition was held on Monday, July 8, 1912. Nineteen long jumpers from eight nations competed. NOCs could enter up to 12 athletes. Ray Ewry, who was the three-time defending champion in the event, did not compete in 1912. The silver medalist from 1908, Konstantinos Tsiklitiras, won the event. Platt Adams, the sixth-place finisher four years earlier, took second. Benjamin Adams finished third. Each of the three standing long jump medalists also medaled in the standing high jump, though in a different order.

Background

This was the fourth and final appearance of the event, which was held four times from 1900 to 1912. Three of the top seven finishers (places behind that are not known) from the 1908 Games returned: silver medalist Konstantinos Tsiklitiras of Greece, fifth-place finisher Ragnar Ekberg of Sweden, and sixth-place finisher Platt Adams of the United States. The man who had won all three of the previous competitions (four if the 1906 Intercalated Games are counted), American Ray Ewry, did not compete.

Hungary and Norway each made their debut in the event. The United States made its fourth appearance, the only nation to have competed in all three editions of the standing long jump to that point.

Competition format

The competition was described as two rounds at the time, but was more similar to the modern divided final. All athletes received three jumps initially. The top three after that received an additional three jumps to improve their distance, but the initial jumps would still count if no improvement was made.

Records

These were the standing world and Olympic records (in metres) prior to the 1912 Summer Olympics.

No new world or Olympic records were set during the competition.

Schedule

Results

References

 sports-reference.com
 
 

Athletics at the 1912 Summer Olympics
Long jump at the Olympics